"No Sympathy" is a reggae song, written and originally recorded by Peter Tosh for his 1976 debut solo album, Legalize It. The British rock musician Eric Clapton recorded a pop rock version of the song during his sessions for his 2013 studio album Old Sock. Although his take on "No Sympathy" was not released on the original Old Sock studio album, it was made available as an online digital single and was released on the limited bonus track edition of the 2013 album.

Chart performance
As a B-side to the "Every Little Thing" maxi single release, the title reached number 40 on the Lista Przebojów Programu Trzeciego music chart in Poland. In the United States, "No Sympathy" reached the Billboard magazine's Adult Contemporary, peaking at position 26 in 2013.

References

2013 singles
Year of song missing
Eric Clapton songs
Peter Tosh songs
Polydor Records singles